Crisis Negotiation Unit may refer to:

FBI Crisis Negotiation Unit, US
Singapore Police Force Crisis Negotiation Unit
Hostage and Crisis Negotiation Unit, London, UK; a unit of the Serious and Organised Crime Command